Therese Björk (born 15 September 1981) is a Swedish footballer who plays for Bergdalens IK.

External links 
Kristianstads
Runner-up
 Svenska Cupen: 2013–14

External links 
 

1981 births
Living people
Swedish women's footballers
Kristianstads DFF players
Vittsjö GIK players
Damallsvenskan players
Women's association football midfielders